Magnus Norman was the defending champion, but lost to Daniel Elsner in the second round.

Franco Squillari won the title, defeating Gastón Gaudio 6–2, 3–6, 4–6, 6–4, 6–2 in the final.

Seeds

Draw

Finals

Top half

Bottom half

References

 Main Draw

Mercedes Cup – Singles
Singles 2000